Duty (also known as "" or "") is a village (selo) in the southern part of Khiloksky District of Zabaykalsky Krai, Russia, located at the confluence of the Duty and Arey Rivers,  away from Khilok.

In the 1950s, a logging post of Areysky Logging-Lumbering Enterprise was located here.  During the 1970s and 1980s, Duty was home to a Soviet Army engineering battalion building the road between Ulan-Ude and Chita. Duty was abandoned in 2002 because of the devastating wildfire, but, as of 2004, it was not officially abolished.

The archeological complex of Shaman-Gora is located in the vicinity of the village.

References

The Encyclopedia of Trans-Baikal.  Entry on "Duty"

Rural localities in Zabaykalsky Krai